Fakhrurrazi Quba (born 29 September 1989) is an Indonesian professional footballer who plays as a goalkeeper for Liga 1 club Madura United.

Club career

Youth career
He began his career in youth level playing for PSBL Langsa and PSLS Lhokseumawe.

PSAP Sigli
In 2010 he joined PSAP Sigli. He played in the 2011-12 Indonesia Super League. He spent his time in PSAP for 2 years.

Semen Padang
In 2013 he joined Semen Padang and spent 4 years playing for them. Within this period, he also played in 2013 AFC Cup matches.

Persiraja
Between 2016 and 2018, he had very bad injuries so that he was recovering and did not play any official match. In 2019, Persiraja signed him to compete in 2019 Liga 2. As the team's first choice goalkeeper, he played a big role to help Persiraja to win third place of the league and secured a promotion to Liga 1. In 2020, Persiraja extended his contract, so he will play for them in 2020 Liga 1.

Madura United
Fakhrurrazi was signed for Madura United to play in Liga 1 in the 2022–23 season.

Club statistics

Honours

Club
Persiraja Banda Aceh
 Liga 2 third place (play-offs): 2019

References

External links
 
 Fakrurrazi at Liga Indonesia 

1989 births
Association football goalkeepers
Living people
Sportspeople from Aceh
Indonesian footballers
Liga 1 (Indonesia) players
Liga 2 (Indonesia) players
PSAP Sigli players
Persiraja Banda Aceh players
Semen Padang F.C. players
Madura United F.C. players
Indonesian Premier Division players
Indonesian Premier League players